Mile Starčević (29 September 1862 – 10 March 1917) was a Croatian politician and a lawyer born in the village of  near Gospić. He was an elected member of the Sabor of the Kingdom of Croatia-Slavonia in 1892–1917 as a member of the Party of Rights. After 1894, Starčević advocated solving the Croatian question within the framework of trialism in Austria-Hungary. Following a political clash within the Party of Rights, Starčević left the party (together with his uncle Ante Starčević, Josip Frank, and Eugen Kumičić) to form the Pure Party of Rights. After a conflict with Frank, in 1908 Starčević formed a new political party known as the Mile Starčević faction of the Party of Rights whose adherents were referred to as the "Milinovci" in reference to Starčević. In 1912, his party abandoned trialism and became allied with the Croat-Serb Coalition led by Frano Supilo and Svetozar Pribičević. During World War I, Starčević left politics. He died in Zagreb.

References

1862 births
1917 deaths
People from Gospić
19th-century Croatian people
20th-century Croatian people
Party of Rights politicians
Representatives in the Croatian Parliament (1848–1918)
History of Gospić